Nebraska Highway 36 is a highway in Nebraska.

Route description
Nebraska Highway 36 begins in far northwestern Douglas County west of a freeway intersection with U.S. Highway 275 between Valley and Fremont.  After a brief northeasterly routing, it turns east into farmland, passes the Elkhorn River and meets Nebraska Highway 31.  It continues east from there and turns southeast towards Bennington.  After passing through the northern edge of Bennington, it goes east, turns southeast briefly, and meets Nebraska Highway 133.  It continues east, passes through the northern edge of Glenn Cunningham Lake and turns southeasterly.  It becomes a four-lane divided highway as it enters increasing residential areas, passes under Interstate 680 and meets its end at U.S. Highway 75 just south of that highway's intersection with I-680 in the Florence neighborhood of Omaha.  Within the city limits of Omaha, it is McKinley Avenue.

History

Prior to 1977, Nebraska Highway 36 extended east over the Mormon Bridge to connect with unsigned Iowa Highway 988.  That year, Interstate 680 was designated to use the bridge.

Major intersections

References

External links

Nebraska Roads: NE 21-40

036
Transportation in Omaha, Nebraska
Transportation in Douglas County, Nebraska